Stanley Rankin Robb (September 19, 1899 – January 9, 1959) was an American football lineman and end who played one season in the National Football League (NFL) for the Canton Bulldogs. He played college football at Centre and West Virginia Wesleyan and also played for several other professional teams.

Early life and education

Robb was born on September 19, 1899, in Pittsburgh, Pennsylvania. He attended Peabody High School where he played football as a tackle, being described as a "star" player. Robb also attended for a time Mercersburg Academy. Around 1917, he registered for World War I. After graduating from high school, he assisted in coaching the linemen at Peabody in 1918. The following year, he was reported as having joined the football team at Penn State College, although a news article from 1920 said that he had played for The Kiski School that year, being a "star guard."

Robb began playing college football for the Centre Praying Colonels in 1920, appearing as a right guard, left guard, and end. He appeared in a number of games for the team, including their match that season against the Harvard Crimson. In the 1920 season finale against TCU, he blocked a punt and returned it for a touchdown. Robb was known for his speed at end, with one newspaper writing that he "gained national repute as one of the fastest ends ever turned out of Centre College."

Robb left to play for the West Virginia Wesleyan football team in 1921. He had left the team by the 1922 season.

In addition to playing football, Robb achieved "fame" for playing basketball and track and field with his schools. At Centre, he also participated in school minstrel productions.

Professional career
Robb began his professional football career in September 1922, starting the season as an end for the Holmesburg Athletic Club. By October, he had joined the Philadelphia Quakers. Following the 1922 season, Robb was signed by the Clifton Heights Orange & Black. The Delaware County Daily Times said that, "The reputation of Stanley Robb not only while he starred for Centre College, but while he was played last season with Holmesburg and the Philadelphia Quakers, is such that he needs no formal introduction to county fans." He missed several games early in the season, but returned at the end of October. With Clifton Heights, he was mentioned as being one of the "stars" comprising "one of the greatest collections of college stars ever seen on a Delaware County gridiron."

Robb played in the Anthracite League with the Pottsville Maroons in 1924. The Maroons ended up winning the league championship. Two years later, Robb was signed by the Canton Bulldogs of the National Football League (NFL). He made his NFL debut against the New York Giants on November 2, 1926, and scored a touchdown in the 7–7 tie. He scored near the end of the game in what was described as a "lucky score" to prevent the Giants from winning. The Canton Daily News reported the play as follows:

Robb appeared in two additional games for the Bulldogs. His next game was against the Hartford Blues on November 7, which resulted in a 16–7 loss. He and Ralph Nichols were both ejected after fighting each other. Robb had tackled a Hartford player, and Nichols, upset with the force which he used, grabbed Robb by the shoulders and "pulled him away rather roughly." Robb responded by punching him in the chin, and Nichols then began punching Robb all around before the official broke up the fight and dismissed both of them. His final game came against the Providence Steamrollers on November 11, after which he left the team.

Robb returned to the Clifton Heights Orange & Black in 1927.

Personal life and death
Robb's brother Harry played college football at Penn State, and later played with him at Pottsville and Canton. Stan played under his brother, who both played and served as head coach, with Canton in 1926.

Robb married Beatrice M. Ritter in November 1937. He registered for World War II in February 1942. Robb died on January 9, 1959, at the age of 59.

References

1899 births
1959 deaths
American football fullbacks
American football ends
American football tackles
American football guards
Canton Bulldogs players
Centre Colonels football players
Holmesburg Athletic Club players
Philadelphia Quakers (AFL) players
Pottsville Maroons players
West Virginia Wesleyan Bobcats football players
High school football coaches in Pennsylvania
Players of American football from Pittsburgh
Coaches of American football from Pennsylvania